Richie Norman (born 5 September 1935 in Newcastle upon Tyne, Northumberland) is an English former footballer who is working as a physio at [Southern League Premier Central Side] side Nuneaton Borough and been in that role with the club for 27 years and still going.

He started his career at Horden Colliery Welfare, before joining Leicester City where he played for nearly 10 years. A brief spell at Peterborough United followed, before leaving the Football League to join Burton Albion.

During the late 1970s he worked under Dave Mckay at Derby County.

References

1935 births
Living people
English footballers
Darlington Town F.C. players
Leicester City F.C. players
Peterborough United F.C. players
Burton Albion F.C. players
Association football defenders
FA Cup Final players